Levashovo Memorial Cemetery commemorates the victims of political repression between 1937 and 1954: some were shot, others  died in the city's prisons, all were buried here in unmarked graves. Archival evidence suggests that 19,540 bodies lie here, 8,000 of whom were shot or died during the Great Terror. The cemetery is located near the rail station at Levashovo, Saint Petersburg, in an empty area referred to in Russian as the Levashovskaya Pustosh (Russian: Левашовская пустошь), the Levashovo Wasteland.

Bodies dating back to the Terror were first found there in spring 1989 by a Memorial (society) exploration group led by V.T. Muravsky. The FSB, successor to the NKVD and KGB, finally handed the area over to the city council in 1990.

Monuments, memorials and plaques

Many collective memorials to particular ethno-confessional groups have been added in the grounds of the cemetery since 1990 (see "Gallery" below) and the large monument of the "Moloch of Totalitarianism" (sculptors Nina Galitskaia and Vitaly Gambarov) was erected by the entrance in 1996. A memorial to Italians who died in the Soviet Gulag was added to the site (Gallery No. 8) in 2007.

By established tradition, relatives or descendants of the victims also began adding their own personal memorials or plaques. By 2017 more than 1,300 of them (Gallery No. 12) were distributed around the 6.5 hectares of the site. They were symbolic acts of remembrance: the actual location of any particular body was not known and impossible to determine.

Annual events

Various annual events are held at the cemetery. On 25 January or the nearest Sunday in January or February, the "Feast of Russia's New Martyrs and Confessors" is celebrated by the St Petersburg Metropolitan of the Russian Orthodox Church.

In June solemn ceremonies are held in Remembrance of the Victims of Political Repression.

On 30 October each year, the Day of Remembrance of the Victims of Political Repressions, commemorative events are organized at the cemetery by the Memorial society and other NGOs. In 2016 the event was attended by NGOs, city officials, diplomats, foreign delegations, representatives of various ethno-confessional groups and relatives and descendants of the victims.

Buried at Levashovo
Some of those known to have died or been executed in the city's prisons before and after the Second World War are listed below. Nikolai Alekseevich Voznesensky, for instance, was sentenced to death in 1950 as the leader of the so-called Leningrad plot. Others like the writers Livshits and Kornilov, or the German communists Rudolf and Anna Tieke, were victims of the Great Terror (1937–1938).

 Igor Akulov
 Evgeny Henkin
 Boris Kornilov
 Alexey Kuznetsov
 Benedikt Livshits
 Nikolai Aleksandrovich Nevsky
 Nikolay Oleynikov
 Mikhail Rodionov
 Julian Shchutsky
 Kirill Stutzka
 Anna and Rudolf Tieke
 Nikolai Alekseevich Voznesensky

Gallery

See also
 Butovo firing range, Moscow Region.
 Day in Remembrance of the Victims of Political Repression. Event in Russia commemorating the Soviet era.
 Kommunarka shooting ground, Moscow.
 Levashovo (air base)
 Mass graves in the Soviet Union
 Sandarmokh, Karelia.
 Solovetsky Stone (Saint Petersburg)

References

External links
 
 Their Names Restored Books of Remembrance at the Russian National Library in St Petersburg (in Russian).
 
 Russian Germans of St.Petersburg
 Russia's Necropolis of Terror and the Gulag: A select directory of burial grounds and commemorative sites Includes over 400 sites throughout Russia.

Cemeteries in Saint Petersburg
1937 deaths
Great Purge victims from Russia
Catholic people executed by the Soviet Union
NKVD
Political repression in the Soviet Union
Mass graves in Russia
Cemeteries in Russia
Politicides
Massacres committed by the Soviet Union
Soviet World War II crimes
Massacres in the Soviet Union
Memorial (society)
Cultural heritage monuments of regional significance in Saint Petersburg